Daniel Bozhkov (born 27 April 1983 in Plovdiv) is a Bulgarian versatile defensive footballer who currently plays for Eurocollege.

Career

Club
Bozhkov has been raised in Botev Plovdiv's youth teams and was the team's captain. He made his official debut in top division of Bulgarian football in a match against Slavia Sofia on 30 August 2002. Bozhkov played for 90 minutes. The result of the match was a 1:4 loss for Botev.

On 22 July 2009, Bozhkov signed a three-year contract with Widzew Łódź. In July 2011, he was loaned to Górnik Łęczna on a one-year deal. He returned to Widzew one year later.

Statistics

International career
In 2005 and 2006, while Hristo Stoichkov was manager of the Bulgaria national football team, Bozhkov played in 3 matches. Daniel made his official debut for Bulgaria in a match against Georgia national football team on 12 November 2005. He played for 90 minutes. The result of the match was a 6:2 win for Bulgaria.

References

External links
 
 

Bulgarian footballers
1983 births
Living people
Footballers from Plovdiv
Association football defenders
Botev Plovdiv players
Widzew Łódź players
Górnik Łęczna players
FC Botev Vratsa players
First Professional Football League (Bulgaria) players
Bulgaria international footballers
Expatriate footballers in Poland
Bulgarian expatriate sportspeople in Poland
Bulgarian expatriate footballers